Peasiella mauritiana is a species of sea snail, a marine gastropod mollusk in the family Littorinidae, the winkles or periwinkles.

References

Littorinidae
Gastropods described in 1951